Community preference was a concept in the European Union in which all the member states would be encouraged by the Institutions of the European Union and the Treaties of the European Union to give priority preference to all goods, trade, services, agricultural products and people from their fellow EU member states over all goods, trade, services and people from non-EU countries. Proponents argued that this would add to the benefits of EU membership by encouraging the member states to trade with each other rather than to trade with non-EU counties who are outside the bloc. It would serve as an integral part of the freedom of movement for workers in the European Union as well as the European Single Market and the European Union Customs Union.

Community preference would not apply to countries  of the European Free Trade Association even though they were members of the European Single Market and observed freedom of movement rules.

It was one of the founding principles of the establishment of the European Communities (which would later become the European Union) when the Treaty of Rome was signed in 1958. But in a judgment in 1994 Greece v Council, Case C-353/92, the European Court of Justice (ECJ) confirmed that Community preference was not a principle of EU law. Its legal basis, Article 44 of the Treaty of Rome, was  repealed by the 1997 Amsterdam Treaty.

See also
 European Union Single Market
 European Union Customs Union
 Common Agricultural Policy
 Common Fisheries Policy

References 

 
Trade blocs